The 2007–08 New York Rangers season was the franchise's 81st season of play and their 82nd season overall. In 2006–07, an impressive late season run brought the team from 12th to 6th place in the Eastern Conference, but the team ran out of steam in the Conference Semifinals before losing in six games to the Buffalo Sabres.

The off-season began in late June with the 2007 NHL Entry Draft in Columbus, Ohio. The Rangers had the 17th overall pick in the first round, yet came away with a steal as Russian superstar Alexei Cherepanov fell for the taking, despite being considered by many rankings to be a top five prospect, and the top European available in the draft.  A variety of reasons have been postulated for Cherepanov's drop, most notably, the lack of a new transfer agreement between the National Hockey League and the International Ice Hockey Federation concerning players from Russia.  In the second round, the Rangers selected goaltender Antoine Lafleur from the P.E.I. Rocket of the QMJHL.  Lafleur was ranked #3 among North American goaltenders by NHL Central Scouting.

The Rangers made a tremendous splash on July 1, the first day of free agency. Within a 30-minute span on that Sunday evening, the Rangers announced the signings of the two most coveted centers available: Scott Gomez from the rival New Jersey Devils and Chris Drury from the Buffalo Sabres.  As both players had worn number 23 with their previous teams, general manager Glen Sather flipped a puck at their introductory press conference to determine who would wear number 23 on the Rangers; the winner was Drury.

After these signings, left out of the picture was center Michael Nylander, who had reportedly signed with the Edmonton Oilers, but then actually signed with the Washington Capitals.  In addition, the Rangers also lost Jed Ortmeyer, Brad Isbister, Karel Rachunek and Kevin Weekes to the free agency market, the latter two signing with the rival New Jersey Devils.

The Rangers re-signed a number of their own free agents, including Jason Strudwick, Petr Prucha and Brendan Shanahan.  Goaltender Henrik Lundqvist and forward Marcel Hossa had been designated for salary arbitration, but both signed contracts before reaching their respective hearings.  Sean Avery did go through arbitration and was awarded a one-year deal worth $1.9 million.

The multitude of high-profile free agent signings in July left the Rangers dangerously close to the league's $50.3 million salary cap.  This effectively forced the Rangers to deal Matt Cullen and his $2.875 million per year cap number back to the Carolina Hurricanes.  At the start of the season, the Rangers total cap number was over the league maximum, but player bonuses can be deferred to the next season if it causes a team to exceed the upper limit of the salary cap, so the Rangers were in compliance.

On April 3, 2008, the New York Rangers clinched a playoff berth for the third consecutive season in a 3–0 win against their crosstown rival Islanders.

Regular season

The Rangers had the most shutouts of all 30 teams in the League, with 12.

Divisional standings

Conference standings

Schedule and results
 Green background indicates win (2 points).
 Red background indicates regulation loss (0 points).
 White background indicates overtime/shootout loss (1 point).

|-  style="text-align:center; background:#cfc;"
| 1 || 4 || Florida Panthers || 5–2 || Lundqvist || 1–0–0
|-  style="text-align:center; background:#fbb;"
| 2 || 6 || @ Ottawa Senators || 2–0 || Lundqvist || 1–1–0
|-  style="text-align:center; background:#fbb;"
| 3 || 10 || @ New York Islanders || 2–1 || Lundqvist || 1–2–0
|-  style="text-align:center; background:#cfc;"
| 4 || 12 || Washington Capitals || 3–1 || Lundqvist || 2–2–0
|-  style="text-align:center; background:#fbb;"
| 5 || 13 || Ottawa Senators || 3–1 || Lundqvist || 2–3–0
|-  style="text-align:center; background:#fbb;"
| 6 || 18 || @ Atlanta Thrashers || 5–3 || Lundqvist || 2–4–0
|-  style="text-align:center; background:white;"
| 7 || 20 || @ Boston Bruins || 1–0 SO || Lundqvist || 2–4–1
|-  style="text-align:center; background:#fbb;"
| 8 || 23 || @ Pittsburgh Penguins || 1–0 || Lundqvist || 2–5–1
|-  style="text-align:center; background:#cfc;"
| 9 || 25 || New Jersey Devils || 2–0 || Lundqvist || 3–5–1
|-  style="text-align:center; background:#fbb;"
| 10 || 27 || Toronto Maple Leafs || 4–1 || Lundqvist || 3–6–1
|-  style="text-align:center; background:#cfc;"
| 11 || 29 || Tampa Bay Lightning || 3–1 || Lundqvist || 4–6–1
|-

|-  style="text-align:center; background:#cfc;"
| 12 || 1 || Washington Capitals || 2–0 || Lundqvist || 5–6–1
|-  style="text-align:center; background:#cfc;"
| 13 || 3 || New Jersey Devils || 2–1 SO || Lundqvist || 6–6–1
|-  style="text-align:center; background:#cfc;"
| 14 || 5 || Philadelphia Flyers || 2–0 || Lundqvist || 7–6–1
|-  style="text-align:center; background:#fbb;"
| 15 || 6 || @ New York Islanders || 3–2 || Lundqvist || 7–7–1
|-  style="text-align:center; background:#cfc;"
| 16 || 8 || Pittsburgh Penguins || 4–2 || Lundqvist || 8–7–1
|-  style="text-align:center; background:#cfc;"
| 17 || 10 || @ Toronto Maple Leafs || 3–2 SO || Valiquette || 9–7–1
|-  style="text-align:center; background:#cfc;"
| 18 || 14 || @ New Jersey Devils || 4–2 || Lundqvist || 10–7–1
|-  style="text-align:center; background:#cfc;"
| 19 || 15 || @ Philadelphia Flyers || 4–3 SO || Lundqvist || 11–7–1
|-  style="text-align:center; background:#cfc;"
| 20 || 17 || @ Pittsburgh Penguins || 4–3 OT || Lundqvist || 12–7–1
|-  style="text-align:center; background:#fbb;"
| 21 || 19 || New York Islanders || 2–1 || Lundqvist || 12–8–1
|-  style="text-align:center; background:#cfc;"
| 22 || 21 || @ Tampa Bay Lightning || 2–1 || Lundqvist || 13–8–1
|-  style="text-align:center; background:white;"
| 23 || 23 || @ Florida Panthers || 3–2 SO || Valiquette || 13–8–2
|-  style="text-align:center; background:#fbb;"
| 24 || 25 || Dallas Stars || 3–2 || Lundqvist || 13–9–2
|-  style="text-align:center; background:#cfc;"
| 25 || 29 || New York Islanders || 4–2 || Lundqvist || 14–9–2
|-

|-  style="text-align:center; background:#cfc;"
| 26 || 1 || @ Ottawa Senators || 5–2 || Lundqvist || 15–9–2
|-  style="text-align:center; background:#fbb;"
| 27 || 3 || Carolina Hurricanes || 4–0 || Lundqvist|| 15–10–2
|-  style="text-align:center; background:#fbb;"
| 28 || 6 || Toronto Maple Leafs || 6–2 || Lundqvist || 15–11–2
|-  style="text-align:center; background:#fbb;"
| 29 || 7 || @ Atlanta Thrashers || 4–2 || Valiquette || 15–12–2
|-  style="text-align:center; background:#cfc;"
| 30 || 9 || New Jersey Devils || 1–0 OT || Lundqvist || 16–12–2
|-  style="text-align:center; background:white;"
| 31 || 12 || @ Washington Capitals || 5–4 OT || Lundqvist || 16–12–3
|-  style="text-align:center; background:#fbb;"
| 32 || 16 || Phoenix Coyotes || 5–1 || Valiquette || 16–13–3
|-  style="text-align:center; background:#cfc;"
| 33 || 18 || Pittsburgh Penguins || 4–0 || Lundqvist || 17–13–3
|-  style="text-align:center; background:#fbb;"
| 34 || 20 || @ Minnesota Wild || 6–3 || Lundqvist || 17–14–3
|-  style="text-align:center; background:white;"
| 35 || 21 || @ Colorado Avalanche || 4–3 OT || Lundqvist || 17–14–4
|-  style="text-align:center; background:#fbb;"
| 36 || 23 || Ottawa Senators || 3–1 || Lundqvist || 17–15–4
|-  style="text-align:center; background:#cfc;"
| 37 || 26 || Carolina Hurricanes || 4–2 || Lundqvist || 18–15–4
|-  style="text-align:center; background:#cfc;"
| 38 || 29 || @ Toronto Maple Leafs || 6–1 || Valiquette || 19–15–4
|-  style="text-align:center; background:#cfc;"
| 39 || 30 || Montreal Canadiens || 4–3 OT || Lundqvist || 20–15–4
|-

|-  style="text-align:center; background:#fbb;"
| 40 || 2 || @ Calgary Flames || 4–3 || Lundqvist || 20–16–4
|-  style="text-align:center; background:#fbb;"
| 41 || 3 || @ Vancouver Canucks || 3–0 || Valiquette || 20–17–4
|-  style="text-align:center; background:white;"
| 42 || 5 || @ Edmonton Oilers || 3–2 SO || Lundqvist || 20–17–5
|-  style="text-align:center; background:#fbb;"
| 43 || 8 || Tampa Bay Lightning || 5–3 || Lundqvist || 20–18–5
|-  style="text-align:center; background:#fbb;"
| 44 || 10 || Philadelphia Flyers || 6–2 || Lundqvist || 20–19–5
|-  style="text-align:center; background:#cfc;"
| 45 || 12 || Montreal Canadiens || 4–1 || Lundqvist || 21–19–5
|-  style="text-align:center; background:#fbb;"
| 46 || 14 || @ Pittsburgh Penguins || 4–1 || Lundqvist || 21–20–5
|-  style="text-align:center; background:#cfc;"
| 47 || 16 || Buffalo Sabres || 2–1 || Lundqvist || 22–20–5
|-  style="text-align:center; background:white;"
| 48 || 19 || @ Boston Bruins || 4–3 SO || Lundqvist || 22–20–6
|-  style="text-align:center; background:#fbb;"
| 49 || 20 || Boston Bruins || 3–1 || Lundqvist || 22–21–6
|-  style="text-align:center; background:#cfc;"
| 50 || 22 || Atlanta Thrashers || 4–0 || Lundqvist || 23–21–6
|-  style="text-align:center; background:#cfc;"
| 51 || 24 || Atlanta Thrashers || 2–1 SO || Lundqvist || 24–21–6
|-  style="text-align:center; background:#fbb;"
| 52 || 29 || @ Carolina Hurricanes || 3–1 || Lundqvist || 24–22–6
|-  style="text-align:center; background:#cfc;"
| 53 || 31 || @ Philadelphia Flyers || 4–0 || Valiquette || 25–22–6
|-

|-  style="text-align:center; background:#cfc;"
| 54 || 1 || @ New Jersey Devils || 3–1 || Lundqvist || 26–22–6
|-  style="text-align:center; background:#cfc;"
| 55 || 3 || @ Montreal Canadiens || 5–3 || Lundqvist || 27–22–6
|-  style="text-align:center; background:#fbb;"
| 56 || 5 || Los Angeles Kings || 4–2 || Lundqvist || 27–23–6
|-  style="text-align:center; background:#fbb;"
| 57 || 7 || Anaheim Ducks || 4–1 || Lundqvist || 27–24–6
|-  style="text-align:center; background:#cfc;"
| 58 || 9 || @ Philadelphia Flyers || 2–0 || Valiquette || 28–24–6
|-  style="text-align:center; background:white;"
| 59 || 10 || @ Washington Capitals || 3–2 OT || Valiquette || 28–24–7
|-  style="text-align:center; background:#cfc;"
| 60 || 16 || Buffalo Sabres || 5–1 || Lundqvist || 29–24–7
|-  style="text-align:center; background:#cfc;"
| 61 || 17 || San Jose Sharks || 3–1 || Lundqvist || 30–24–7
|-  style="text-align:center; background:white;"
| 62 || 19 || @ Montreal Canadiens || 6–5 SO || Lundqvist || 30–24–8
|-  style="text-align:center; background:#cfc;"
| 63 || 23 || @ Buffalo Sabres || 4–3 || Lundqvist || 31–24–8
|-  style="text-align:center; background:#cfc;"
| 64 || 24 || Florida Panthers || 5–0 || Lundqvist || 32–24–8
|-  style="text-align:center; background:#cfc;"
| 65 || 28 || @ Carolina Hurricanes || 4–2 || Lundqvist || 33–24–8
|-

|-  style="text-align:center; background:#cfc;"
| 66 || 2 || Philadelphia Flyers || 5–4 SO || Valiquette || 34–24–8
|-  style="text-align:center; background:white;"
| 67 || 4 || New York Islanders || 4–3 SO || Lundqvist || 34–24–9
|-  style="text-align:center; background:#cfc;"
| 68 || 6 || @ New York Islanders || 4–1 || Lundqvist || 35–24–9
|-  style="text-align:center; background:#cfc;"
| 69 || 9 || Boston Bruins || 1–0 SO || Lundqvist || 36–24–9
|-  style="text-align:center; background:#cfc;"
| 70 || 10 || @ Buffalo Sabres || 3–2 SO || Lundqvist || 37–24–9
|-  style="text-align:center; background:#fbb;"
| 71 || 14 || @ Florida Panthers || 3–2 || Lundqvist || 37–25–9
|-  style="text-align:center; background:#fbb;"
| 72 || 15 || @ Tampa Bay Lightning || 3–0 || Lundqvist || 37–26–9
|-  style="text-align:center; background:#cfc;"
| 73 || 18 || Pittsburgh Penguins || 5–2 || Lundqvist || 38–26–9
|-  style="text-align:center; background:#cfc;"
| 74 || 19 || @ New Jersey Devils || 2–1 SO || Lundqvist || 39–26–9
|-  style="text-align:center; background:white;"
| 75 || 21 || @ Philadelphia Flyers || 4–3 SO || Valiquette || 39–26–10
|-  style="text-align:center; background:white;"
| 76 || 25 || Philadelphia Flyers || 2–1 OT || Lundqvist || 39–26–11
|-  style="text-align:center; background:#cfc;"
| 77 || 27 || New Jersey Devils || 3–2 || Lundqvist || 40–26–11
|-  style="text-align:center; background:#fbb;"
| 78 || 30 || @ Pittsburgh Penguins || 3–1 || Lundqvist || 40–27–11
|-  style="text-align:center; background:#cfc;"
| 79 || 31 || Pittsburgh Penguins || 2–1 OT || Lundqvist || 41–27–11
|-

|-  style="text-align:center; background:#cfc;"
| 80 || 3 || @ New York Islanders || 3–0 || Lundqvist || 42–27–11
|-  style="text-align:center; background:white;"
| 81 || 4 || New York Islanders || 4–3 SO || Lundqvist || 42–27–12
|-  style="text-align:center; background:white;"
| 82 || 6 || @ New Jersey Devils || 3–2 SO || Lundqvist || 42–27–13
|-

Playoffs

The New York Rangers ended the 2007–08 regular season as the Eastern Conference's fifth seed.
 Green background indicates win.  
 Red background indicates loss.   
The Rangers defeated the New Jersey Devils in the Eastern Conference quarter-finals in five games.  This was the fifth playoff meeting between the two clubs, with the Rangers having won four of those series. They were eventually eliminated in the Eastern Conference semi-finals by the Pittsburgh Penguins in five games.

Player statistics
Skaters

Goaltenders

†Denotes player spent time with another team before joining Rangers. Stats reflect time with Rangers only.
‡Traded mid-season. Stats reflect time with Rangers only.

Awards and records

Milestones

Transactions
The Rangers have been involved in the following transactions during the 2007–08 season.

Trades

|}

Free agents acquired

Free agents lost

Player signings

* Sean Avery re-signed through salary arbitration.

Draft picks
New York's picks at the 2007 NHL Entry Draft in Columbus, Ohio, at the Nationwide Arena.

Farm teams

Hartford Wolf Pack (AHL)
The 2007–08 season was the 11th season of AHL hockey for the franchise.  The team's status as the Rangers' highest-level minor-league affiliate became questionable when Northland AEG LLC purchased the Hartford Civic Center from Madison Square Garden, L.P.; however, on May 29, 2007, it was announced that the franchise will remain in Hartford and will remain affiliated with the Rangers.

Hartford finished the regular season with a record of 50–20–2–8 for a total of 110 points, a franchise high. P. A. Parenteau led the team with 81 points in 75 games, and team captain Andrew Hutchinson won the Eddie Shore Award as the league's top defenseman.

Portland eliminated Hartford from the playoffs in 5 games, marking two consecutive season's that the Wolf Pack failed to advance past the 1st round.

Charlotte Checkers (ECHL)
The 2007–08 season was the 15th season of ECHL hockey for the franchise.

Charlotte finished the regular season with a record of 34–31–1–6 for a total of 75 points. Gwinnett eliminated the Checkers from the playoffs in 3 games.

See also
 2007–08 NHL season

References
 Game log: New York Rangers game log on espn.com
 Player stats: New York Rangers statistics on espn.com

New York Rangers seasons
New York Rangers
New York Rangers
New York Rangers
New York Rangers
 in Manhattan
Madison Square Garden